Austrodrillia subplicata is a species of sea snail, a marine gastropod mollusk in the family Horaiclavidae.

It was formerly included within the family Turridae.

Description
The length of the shell attains 7 mm, its diameter is 3 mm.

(Original description) The short, solid shell is narrowly oval, with a blunt apex and a slightly contracted base. The protoconch consists of two smooth, slightly convex whorls. The four whorls of the spire are sloping scarcely convex. The sutures are linear. The aperture is oval, slightly contracted behind, opening widely into a very short siphonal canal in front. The outer lip is simple; with a shallow, round sinus near the suture, a convex profile, and a very faint sinus anteriorly. The inner lip shows a complete, applied narrow glaze. The columella is straight and slightly bent to the left in the siphonal canal. There are faint oblique axial ribs, equal to the interspaces. The shell shows well-marked crowded sinuous incremental striae. There is no spiral sculpture. The colour of the shell is light brown, with a band of lighter colour on the middle of the spire-whorls, whitish where it crosses the ribs. There are three light bands on the body whorl.

Distribution
This marine species is endemic to Australia and occurs off South Australia.

References

 Hedley, C. 1922. "A revision of the Australian Turridae". Records of the Australian Museum 13(6): 213–359, pls 42–56 
 Wells, F.E. 1990. "Revision of the recent Australian Turridae referred to the genera Splendrillia and Austrodrillia". Journal of the Malacological Society of Australasia 11: 73–117 
 Wilson, B. 1994. Australian Marine Shells. Prosobranch Gastropods. Kallaroo, WA : Odyssey Publishing Vol. 2 370 pp.

External links
 Tucker, J.K. 2004 Catalog of recent and fossil turrids (Mollusca: Gastropoda). Zootaxa 682:1–1295

subplicata
Gastropods of Australia